The following is a list of the MTV Europe Music Award winners and nominees for Best Adriatic Act.

2000s

2010s

MTV Europe Music Awards
Music history of Slovenia
Awards established in 2005